Elkton is a city in Brookings County, South Dakota, United States. The population was 755 at the 2020 census. Some of Elkton's population also have Minnesota addresses since the city is located so close to the state line.

History
Elkton was platted in 1880. It was named after the city of Elkton, Maryland.

Eventually, Elkton took damages after the derecho in May 12, 2022.

Geography
Elkton is located at  (44.235716, -96.481887).

Elkton has been assigned the ZIP code 57026 and the FIPS place code 18700.

Demographics

Since 2008 there have been 28 single family units added to the community.

2010 census
As of the census of 2010, there were 736 people, 286 households, and 190 families residing in the city. The racial makeup of the city was 85.2% White, 0.4% African American, 12.1% from other races, and 2.3% from two or more races. Hispanic or Latino of any race were 14.5% of the population.

There were 286 households, of which 32.9% had children under the age of 18 living with them, 53.5% were married couples living together, 7.3% had a female householder with no husband present, 5.6% had a male householder with no wife present, and 33.6% were non-families. 28.7% of all households were made up of individuals, and 14% had someone living alone who was 65 years of age or older. The average household size was 2.53 and the average family size was 3.12.

The median age in the city was 31.9 years. 26.6% of residents were under the age of 18; 7.8% were between the ages of 18 and 24; 29.3% were from 25 to 44; 22.1% were from 45 to 64; and 14.1% were 65 years of age or older. The gender makeup of the city was 51.8% male and 48.2% female.

2000 census
As of the census of 2000, there were 677 people, 267 households, and 185 families residing in the city. The population density was 436.2 people per square mile (168.6/km2). There were 289 housing units at an average density of 186.2 per square mile (72.0/km2). The racial makeup of the city was 98.82% White, 0.15% African American, 0.30% Native American, and 0.74% from two or more races. Hispanic or Latino of any race were 0.44% of the population.

There were 267 households, out of which 33.0% had children under the age of 18 living with them, 57.3% were married couples living together, 8.2% had a female householder with no husband present, and 30.7% were non-families. 27.7% of all households were made up of individuals, and 17.2% had someone living alone who was 65 years of age or older. The average household size was 2.51 and the average family size was 3.08.

In the city, the population was spread out, with 27.9% under the age of 18, 6.8% from 18 to 24, 24.1% from 25 to 44, 21.1% from 45 to 64, and 20.1% who were 65 years of age or older. The median age was 39 years. For every 100 females, there were 96.2 males. For every 100 females age 18 and over, there were 96.8 males.

The median income for a household in the city was $36,667, and the median income for a family was $47,969. Males had a median income of $30,313 versus $21,667 for females. The per capita income for the city was $18,912. About 5.9% of families and 6.8% of the population were below the poverty line, including 2.9% of those under age 18 and 18.7% of those age 65 or over.

Education
The Elkton Public School is the only school in Elkton. It is home to the grades of Kindergarten through 12th Grade and includes pre-school.  The high school has won multiple state championships since it began and was the first to win three state championships in Boys Basketball. In 2010 the Girls Basketball team won the Class A State Tournament.

See also

 List of cities in South Dakota

References

External links

 

Cities in Brookings County, South Dakota
Cities in South Dakota
1880 establishments in Dakota Territory
Populated places established in 1880